William "Randy" Randolph Stein (March 7, 1953 – December 12, 2011) was an American baseball player in Major League Baseball. He was a pitcher for the Milwaukee Brewers, Seattle Mariners and Chicago Cubs.

Career
Stein was born in Pomona, California to Don and Irene Stein, He graduated from Ganesha High School in Pomona. He was drafted by the Baltimore Orioles in the 1st round (23rd pick) of the 1971 Major League Baseball Draft. He played his first game in MLB on April 17, 1978 for the [Milwaukee Brewers.

Death
Stein died on December 12, 2011, in Rancho Cucamonga, California, after battling early-onset Alzheimer's disease.

References

External links

Randy Stein at Baseball Almanac

1953 births
2011 deaths
Aberdeen Pheasants players
American expatriate baseball players in Canada
Asheville Orioles players
Baseball players from California
Chicago Cubs players
Deaths from dementia in California
Deaths from Alzheimer's disease
Iowa Cubs players
Major League Baseball pitchers
Miami Orioles players
Milwaukee Brewers players
Rochester Red Wings players
Seattle Mariners players
Spokane Indians players
Sportspeople from Pomona, California
Syracuse Chiefs players
Vancouver Canadians players